Schwarzenau is a market town in the District Zwettl in the Austrian state of Lower Austria. Schwarzenau is located on the German Thaya.

Population

People
 Florian Berndl (1856-1934)

References

External links 

Cities and towns in Zwettl District